Kalateh-ye Baraq-e Olya (also Romanized as Kalāteh-ye Baraq-e ‘Olyā) is a village in Doruneh Rural District, Anabad District, Bardaskan County, Razavi Khorasan Province, Iran. At the 2006 census, its population was 153, in 37 families.

References 

Populated places in Bardaskan County